Juan Lavenás (5 September 1914 – 1979) was an Argentine sprinter. He competed in the men's 4 × 100 metres relay at the 1936 Summer Olympics.

References

1914 births
1979 deaths
Athletes (track and field) at the 1936 Summer Olympics
Argentine male sprinters
Argentine male hurdlers
Olympic athletes of Argentina
Place of birth missing